Waikato (often known as the Waikato Mooloos) are a New Zealand professional rugby union team based in Hamilton, New Zealand. The union was originally established in 1921, with the National Provincial Championship established in 1976. They now play in the reformed National Provincial Championship competition. They play their home games at FMG Stadium Waikato in Hamilton in the Waikato region. The team is affiliated with the Chiefs Super Rugby franchise. Their home playing colours are red, yellow and black.

Current squad

The Waikato Mooloos squad for the 2022 Bunnings NPC is:

Honours

Waikato have been overall Champions on three occasions, winning the titles in 1992, 2006 and 2021. Their full list of honours include:

National Provincial Championship Second Division North Island
Winners: 1980

National Provincial Championship Second Division
Winners: 1986

National Provincial Championship First Division
Winners: 1992

Air New Zealand Cup
Winners: 2006

Mitre 10 Cup Championship Division
Winners: 2018

Bunnings NPC Premiership Division
Winners: 2021

Current Super Rugby players
Players named in the 2022 Waikato Mooloos squad, who also earned contracts or were named in a squad for any side participating in the 2022 Super Rugby Pacific season.

References

External links
Official site

National Provincial Championship
New Zealand rugby union teams